Min-a-he-quo-sis 116A is an Indian reserve of the Little Pine First Nation in Saskatchewan.

References

Indian reserves in Saskatchewan